Michael John Rae (born July 26, 1951) is a former professional American football quarterback in the National Football League (NFL) and Canadian Football League (CFL).

Early life
Rae attended and played high school football at Lakewood High School.

College career
Rae played college football at the University of Southern California.  In 1972 Rae was at the helm as the Trojans went undefeated to a Rose Bowl win en route to the National Championship.

1970: 20/45 for 331 yards with 4 TD and 1 INT.
1971: 38/79 for 599 yards with 7 TD and 4 INT.
1972: 114/199 for 1754 yards with 5 TD and 12 INT. 82 carries for 247 yards and 5 TD.

Professional career
After USC, he was the backup quarterback for the Toronto Argonauts of the Canadian Football League before being not offered a contract after 1975 season. Rae played for the Oakland Raiders, Tampa Bay Buccaneers and Washington Redskins between 1976 and 1981. Rae also shared quarterback duties with former UCLA quarterback Tom Ramsey during the inaugural season of the L.A. Express of the United States Football League (USFL) in 1983.

Now

Since 2008, Rae has been the men's golf coach at Saddleback College in Mission Viejo, California.

References

1951 births
Living people
American football quarterbacks
Oakland Raiders players
Players of American football from Long Beach, California
Players of Canadian football from Long Beach, California
Tampa Bay Buccaneers players
Washington Redskins players
USC Trojans football players
Toronto Argonauts players
Canadian football quarterbacks
Los Angeles Express players